Federico Sada González (born 19 July 1949 in Monterrey, Nuevo León - death 10 November 2022 in Monterrey, Nuevo León) is a Mexican businessman and the current president of the Mexico-France Bilateral Business Committee of the Mexican Business Council for Foreign Trade, Investment, and Technology (COMCE). He is the former CEO of Vitro, S.A. de C.V., one of the world's leading glass producers. Federico is Chairman of the Fundación Pro Museo Nacional de Historia and is also a member of the Fox Center Civil Association, affiliated with former  President of Mexico Vicente Fox.

References

External links
 Center of Studies, Library and Museum Vicente Fox
 Vitro, S.A. de C.V.

Mexican chief executives
Businesspeople from Monterrey
Monterrey Institute of Technology and Higher Education alumni
1949 births
Living people